The Diagram Brothers were a post-punk band from Manchester, England active between 1979 and 1982. The band comprised Andy Diagram (bass guitar), Fraser Diagram (vocals, guitar), Lawrence Diagram (guitar), Jason Diagram (bass), and Simon Diagram (drums) (not actually brothers). Andy Diagram was also a member of Dislocation Dance from 1978 to 1982, and in 1985, and was a member of The Pale Fountains and James.

Andy Diagram explained the band's approach: "We called the music 'Discordo'. The music was made to a strict formula or set of rules. All the guitar chords were based on discordant notes, all the beats were very simple rock or disco, and all the words were very very straightforward and down to earth." Music journalist, Stuart Maconie, described them as "funny, slightly scary and like no one else in the world".

The band's first release was a 7" EP on the Construct label in 1980. They were then signed by Buzzcocks' New Hormones label, who issued a single, "Bricks", an album, Some Marvels of Modern Science, and a 10" EP, Discordo, before the band split up. They have been compared to The Residents and XTC.

They recorded three sessions for John Peel's BBC Radio 1 show. Their collected studio recordings (including the Peel sessions) have since been released on CD by the LTM label.

Discography
Chart placings shown are from the UK Indie Chart.
"We Are All Animals" 7" EP (1980) Construct (#30)
"Bricks" 7" single (1981) New Hormones (#46)
Some Marvels of Modern Science LP (1981) New Hormones
Discordo 10" EP (1982) New Hormones
German E.P. 7" EP (1982) Outatune
Some Marvels of Modern Science + Singles CD (2007) LTM (LTMCD 2480)
 The Peel Sessions CD (2011)  LTM (LTMCD 2558)

References

External links
The Diagram Brothers on Myspace
Diagram Brothers biography at LTM
Interview with The Diagram Brothers from 2007

English post-punk music groups
Musical groups from Manchester
Musical groups established in 1979
Musical groups disestablished in 1982